Graphium mendana is a species of butterfly in the family Papilionidae, that is found in Papua New Guinea and the Solomon Islands.

See also

 East Melanesian Islands

References

Racheli, Tommaso, 1979 New subspecies of Papilio and Graphium from the Solomon Islands, with observations on Graphium codrus (Lepidoptera, Papilionidae). Zoologische Mededelingen 54 (15): 237-240, 1 plate pdf

mendana
Lepidoptera of New Guinea
Taxa named by Frederick DuCane Godman
Taxa named by Osbert Salvin
Taxonomy articles created by Polbot
Butterflies described in 1888